AST SpaceMobile is a publicly traded satellite designer and manufacturer based in Midland, Texas, United States. 
The company is building the SpaceMobile satellite constellation, a space-based cellular broadband network that will allow existing, unmodified smartphones to connect to satellites in areas with coverage gaps. Its BlueWalker 3 prototype satellite is the largest commercial communications array in low Earth orbit after launch in 2022.

History
AST SpaceMobile was founded in May 2017 by Abel Avellan as AST & Science LLC. Avellan remains the chairman and chief executive officer of the company. Originally from Venezuela, Avellan is a United States citizen who previously worked for Swedish telecommunications conglomerate Ericsson.

AST & Science purchased a controlling interest in NanoAvionics, a Lithuanian satellite manufacturing company, on March 6, 2018.

In March 2020, AST & Science LLC announced a round of investment, led by Vodafone and Rakuten, that raised $110 million for the company. Samsung Next, American Tower, and Cisneros also participated in that Series B investment.

New Providence's first SPAC announced in April 2021 that its shareholders had approved a proposal to form AST SpaceMobile in a business combination with AST & Science LLC.. AST SpaceMobile began to trade on the Nasdaq in the week after that announcement. New Providence had raised $462 million through IPO and PIPE proceeds to fully fund the development and first phase of its satellite constellation in the initial public offering.

AST SpaceMobile does not expect to begin generating revenue until the company launches its operational satellites. The mobile network operators with whom the company has agreements and understandings collectively serve over 1.8 billion existing subscribers.

In July 2022, Nokia announced that it had won a five-year 4G and 5G deal from AST SpaceMobile.

Development 
BlueWalker 1, the first satellite of AST & Science LLC, was launched on April 1, 2019 from the Satish Dhawan Space Centre on the PSLV-C45. Lithuanian smallsat company NanoAvionics built BlueWalker 1.

In July 2021, AST SpaceMobile announced an agreement with SpaceX to launch its second satellite, BlueWalker 3, in March 2022. Later in 2021, AST SpaceMobile delayed the launch of BlueWalker 3 until summer 2022. BlueWalker 3 was successfully launched on September 10, 2022, on a Falcon 9 Block 5 rocket from Kennedy Space Center Launch Complex 39A. The 693-square-foot antenna array of BlueWalker 3 was successfully unfolded to full deployment on November 10, 2022. AST SpaceMobile expects BlueWalker 3 to have a field of view of over 300,000 square miles.

In March 2022, AST SpaceMobile announced a multi-launch contract with SpaceX to launch its first BlueBird operational satellite. AST SpaceMobile states that it will be able to produce up to six BlueBird satellites per month at two manufacturing sites in Midland, Texas. The company has attributed delays in the deployment schedule of its operational satellites to supply chain issues and price increases. AST SpaceMobile stated in November 2022 that it expects to launch five Block 1 BlueBird satellites by late 2023.

Licenses 

In October 2020, NASA filed a letter with the FCC during the public-comment period related to this petition to express concerns about the risk of collisions between the SpaceMobile satellite constellation and the A-train satellite constellation, due to the proposed orbital altitude for SpaceMobile as well as the size and scale of the SpaceMobile project. In November 2020, NASA submitted a second letter to the FCC to revise its original stance as a result of AST SpaceMobile's demonstrated interest in collaborating with NASA to mitigate risks. In its second letter, NASA stated that technical concerns "need not preclude the issuance of the requested license" and that NASA had no concern with the license being granted. Three United States Senators and one United States Congressman also filed letters with the FCC in support of SpaceMobile.

United States wireless provider AT&T has partnered with AST SpaceMobile in a joint effort to provide satellite-based wireless service to remote areas of its coverage area. AT&T has filed a letter with the FCC in support of the petition for a license to operate in the United States, while AT&T's major competitors T-Mobile and Verizon have asked the FCC to deny such a license.

In May 2022, the FCC granted AST SpaceMobile an experimental license to connect to the BlueWalker 3 satellite. The FCC has neither granted nor denied a license for AST SpaceMobile's BlueBird operational satellites.

Impact on astronomy 
The SpaceMobile constellation has drawn criticism for its potential contribution to light pollution in the night sky, as well as radio-frequency interference with certain telescopes that operate outside of the visible light spectrum.

Observations of BlueWalker 3 were obtained after it unfolded into a large flat-panel shape in November 2022. The measurements indicate that the fully deployed satellite is very bright and usually approaches first magnitude when it is near the zenith.
Follow-up observations in December revealed a deep but temporary fading. The dimming was attributed to a change in the orientation of the flat-panel needed in order to boost solar power generation. This finding indicated that the satellite operator can reduce the luminosity of their constellation and mitigate its adverse impact on astronomy by making a small adjustment to the spacecraft orientation.

See also 
 Phased array
 Beamforming

References

Communications satellite operators
Companies listed on the Nasdaq
Space technology
Aerospace companies of the United States
American companies established in 2017